Chhatabar is a village in the Sambalpur district of Odisha, India. (There is another village called Chhatabar in Jatani block, Khordha district, Odisha).

Geography
The village is located on the side of the Mahanadi, on the way to Sonepur, 15 km from district headquarters Sambalpur. It is surrounded by hills.

Culture
Temples include:
 Jaganath Temple
 Ram Temple
 Hanuman Temple
 Samleswari Temple
  (or sacred grove)
Nuakhai is the major festival. Every year Naam is held, conducted in the worship of Sriram for 7 days.

Education
Chhatabar has a primary school, the Government Up School, Chhatabar, established in 1910 during British rule, a high school named Gour Charana Bidyapitha, Chhatabar, established in 1983, and a college named Bauri Bandhu Mahabidyalaya.

References

Villages in Sambalpur district